Stichodactylidae is a family of sea anemones that contains the genera Stichodactyla (carpet anemones) and Heteractis. These sea anemones exclusively reside within the shallow waters of the tropical Indo-Pacific area and are in the main family of sea anemones that hosts several varieties of clownfishes. Most sea anemone species are harmless to humans, but at least some Stichodactyla are highly venomous and their sting may cause anaphylactic shock and organ failure (notably acute liver failure). In contrast, the venom of Heteractis  has shown potential in treatment of lung cancer.

Discovery
C. Collingwood first discovered Stichodactylidae back in 1868 after taking note on the existence of gigantic sea-anemones in the China Sea, containing quasi-parasitic fish.

Genera and species
The following species are recognized within the family Stichodactylidae:

Genus Heteractis
Heteractis aurora
Sebae anemone (Heteractis crispa)
Heteractis magnifica
Heteractis malu
Genus Stichodactyla (carpet anemones)
Stichodactyla gigantea
Stichodactyla haddoni
Stichodactyla helianthus
Stichodactyla mertensii
Stichodactyla tapetum

Gallery

References

 
Actinioidea
Taxa named by Angelo Andres